Émile Lévy (August 29, 1826 in Paris – 1890) was a French genre and portrait painter.

Biography
He was a pupil of François-Édouard Picot and Abel de Pujol. He also studied at the École des Beaux-Arts in Paris. He won the Grand Prix de Rome in 1854. On his return from Italy, he settled in Paris, and devoted himself to portrait painting. He exhibited in the Salon, receiving a first-class medal in 1878, and the Legion of Honor in 1867. Among the more important of his works are: “Noah Cursing Canaan” (1855); “Supper of the Martyrs” (1859); “Death of Orpheus” (1866), Luxembourg Museum; “Love and Folly” (1874); “Infancy” (1885); “The Elements,” Salon of Ministry of State, Louvre; “Presentation of the Virgin,” Trinity Church, Paris.

Notes

References

External links

http://www.artcyclopedia.com/artists/levy_emile.html
Emile Levy at the Art Renewal Center

1826 births
1890 deaths
19th-century French painters
French male painters
French genre painters
Painters from Paris
École des Beaux-Arts alumni
Recipients of the Legion of Honour
Prix de Rome for painting
19th-century French male artists